Tsankawi is a detached portion of Bandelier National Monument in New Mexico, near White Rock. It is accessible from a roadside parking area just north of the intersection of East Jemez Road and State Road 4.  A self-guided 1.5-mile loop trail provides access to numerous unexcavated ruins, caves carved into soft tuff, and petroglyphs.

Origin of the name 
The name Tsankawi  (Sa'ekewikwaje Owingeh) may mean "village between two canyons at the clump of sharp round cacti" or more simply, (san-ke-wii) "Opuntia sharp gap" in the Tewa language of the nearby San Idelfonso puebloans.

History 

Tsankawi (san-KAH-wee) was built by ancient Pueblo Indians sometimes known as the Ancestral Pueblo People. Archeological evidence indicates that Tsankawi may have been constructed in the 15th century and occupied until the late 16th century—toward the end of the Rio Grande Classic Period.  It was occupied by Ancestral Pueblo people. Dendrochronology (tree-ring dating) indicates that a severe drought occurred in the late 16th century. Traditions at a number of nearby Tewa Pueblos, including San Ildefonso Pueblo, Santa Clara Pueblo, Pojoaque Pueblo, and Tesuque Pueblo claim ancestral ties to Tsankawi and other nearby pueblo sites.

Archeological evidence indicates that the Indians first settled the surrounding area in small communities during the late 12th century. Over time, fewer but larger communities were built - Tsankawi was one of these larger communities. The trail follows centuries-old paths through the area where the ancestral Pueblo people lived.

According to Pueblo tradition; the people of Tsankawi spoke Tewa, while those in Frijoles Canyon (the main section of Bandelier) spoke Keres. While their languages were different - their religious beliefs, lifestyles, and worldviews were similar. Even today, the active pueblos San Ildefonso, Cochiti, and others retain strong social and traditional ties with these two cultural sites.

The 1.5-mile trail through Tsankawi takes you along centuries-old paths of the ancestral Pueblo people. In many areas, the trails have been worn into the rock 8 to 24 inches or more, as the natives traveled from the mesa tops to their farms in the canyons below. The trails also connected to other villages in the surrounding area - the travelers commonly wore sandals or walked barefoot.

Much of the site has never been excavated. Edgar Hewett, however, excavated at least 2 burial mounds near the main pueblo room blocks during his studies of the area during the late 1800s and early 1900s.

Tsankawi village

The village was built out of tuff stone (plastered inside) and mud. It was roughly rectangular in shape, with about 350 rooms and an enclosed central courtyard or plaza. Not only were the rooms used for cooking and sleeping, but for storage of food for the winter months or when crops failed. The architectural design with rooms surrounding a central plaza is still used by present-day Indians. The buildings were two or perhaps three stories high, with roofs made of wood and mud.

The Tsankawi inhabitants were dependent upon the environment for survival. The climate was dry, averaging 15 inches of rainfall a year, yet the inhabitants developed an agricultural way of life. They used native plants such as the pinion pine, juniper, rabbitbrush, saltbush, mountain mahogany, and yucca for food, dyes, medicine, and tools. They also cultivated corn, beans, and squash. However, natural resources were scarce in this sparse environment, and over time, the Puebloans depleted their resources. Firewood became hard to find, and the soil became exhausted due to centuries of farming. During the 16th century an extended drought, indicated by tree ring dating, forced the inhabitants to move on. The pueblo at San Ildefonso, 8 miles away, has the tradition that their ancestors lived at Tsankawi and the surrounding area.

The people of Tsankawi were not isolated - there were many villages on nearby mesas or in the canyons. The people traded tools, blankets, pottery, feathers, turquoise, seashells, and agricultural products - they also joined together for religious activities. The village plaza may have been a gathering place for dancing and ceremonies.

Since there was no metal, tools were made from local materials. Obsidian formed by the Jemez volcanoes was used to make arrow points, knives, and scrapers. Volcanic basalt was used as Manos and metates to grind seeds and corn - it was also used to enlarge the soft tuff caves and shape blocks used in building.

After the inhabitants left in the late 16th century, the buildings unfortunately fell into ruin - the roofs collapsed, and the walls crumbled. Wind-blown materials filled the cracks and crevices so that only mounds of rubble could be seen with pieces of pottery lying on the ground.

Tsankawi cave dwellings

The ancient pueblo inhabitants of Tsankawi not only had a settlement on top of the mesa, but built their homes along the base of the cliffs. They dug caves into the soft tuff stone and extended the dwelling with walls made of talus rock mortared with mud. The roofs were made with timber and mud. These dwellings are called talus pueblos. 354 talus pueblos have been documented on Tsankawi Mesa with most located at the weak boundary between the Tshirege and Otowi members of the Bandelier Tuff that forms the bedrock of the mesa. Since the time that the talus pueblos were inhabited, the masonry walls have collapsed. The only remaining evidence are caves, or cavates, carved into the cliffs and socket holes which were used to support timbers for the roof. Where not exposed to the elements, the caves are blackened from fires used for cooking and for heat during the winter months. The talus pueblos were built on the south facing side of the mesas. During winter months the afternoon sun would warm the southern cliffs melting the snow, but the north-facing cliffs frequently had snow all winter long. The walls were frequently plastered with clay, perhaps for aesthetic reasons, or to help prevent the walls from crumbling. Artwork along the walls can be seen in a number of the caves in the form of pictographs carved into the rock and painting remnants where clay still sticks to the walls.

Tsankawi petroglyphs

Numerous petroglyphs - designs carved into stone - can be found around Tsankawi, located along the cliffs and in some of the cave dwellings. Carvings were made in soft tuff stone which is easily eroded, meaning many drawings have become difficult to see or have disappeared altogether. Some of the meanings of the figures are known among modern-day Indians and are culturally significant to them. Other petroglyphs, we can only speculate about what the people were trying to say.

Among the petroglyphs are figures of people, animals, birds, four pointed stars and other designs.  Similar carvings in tuff stone can be found at Frijoles canyon and an extensive collection of petroglyphs can be found south of Bandelier National Monument at Petroglyph National Monument.

Duchess castle 

To the northeast are the remains of a home and school built by Madame (not actually a duchess but a baroness) Vera von Blumenthal and her friend Rose Dougan in 1918. They provided instruction to the potters of local pueblos on how to revive techniques with the intent of making the pottery more collectable, which would, in turn, provide income to the pueblo community.

Directions 
The Tsankawi section of Bandelier National Monument is located on State Highway 4 twelve miles from the main section of the park.
GPS coordinates of entrance: 35.859, -106.224

See also
Tsirege
Puye Cliff Dwellings

References 

 Edward S. Curtis's The North American Indian Volume 17
 Tsankawi Trail Guide
 Tsankawi at Scienceviews.com
 Tsankawi Cave Dwellings  at Scienceviews.com
 Tsankawi Petroglyphs  at Scienceviews.com

External links 

National Park Service info
 Trail guide
Photo guide to Tsankawi trail

Archaeological sites in New Mexico
Bandelier National Monument
Protected areas of Santa Fe County, New Mexico
Puebloan buildings and structures
Cave dwellings